The 2016–17 Ligue 1 Mauritania season was the 37th season of the premier football league in Mauritania. It began on 24 September 2016 and concluded on 25 May 2017.

Standings

References

Mauritanian Premier League seasons
Premier League
Premier League
Mauritania